Madolenihmw is one of the administrative divisions of the Micronesian island of Pohnpei. It is located in the central east of the island, to the east of Mount Nahna Laud and south of Mount Kapwuriso. The coast of Madolenihmw includes a large bay which contains the island of Temwen, famous for its Nan Madol ruins.

Climate

Education
Pohnpei State Department of Education operates public schools:
 Madolenihmw High School
 ESDM Elementary School
 Lukop Elementary School
 Mand Elementary School
 Pohnlangas Elementary School
 Sapwalap Elementary School
 Temwen Elementary School
 Wapar Elementary School

Private schools:
 Ohwa Christian High School

See also
 Kitti (municipality)
 Sokehs
 U, Pohnpei
 Nett
 Kapingamarangi
 Pingelap
 Sapwuahfik
 Nukuoro
 Mokil
 Kolonia
 Oroluk
 Palikir

References

 Bendure, G., & Friary, N. (1988) Micronesia: A travel survival kit. South Yarra, Australia: Lonely Planet.

Municipalities of Pohnpei